The 2016 United States House of Representatives elections in Georgia were held on November 8, 2016, to elect the fourteen U.S. representatives from the state of Georgia, one from each of the state's fourteen congressional districts. The elections coincided with the 2016 U.S. presidential election, as well as other elections to the House of Representatives, elections to the United States Senate and various state and local elections. The primaries took place on May 24.

Results summary

By district
Results of the general election by district:

District 1

The incumbent was Republican Buddy Carter, who has represented the district since 2015. Carter is running unopposed.

Republican primary

Candidates

Nominee
Buddy Carter, incumbent U.S. Representative

Results

General election

Results

District 2

The incumbent was Democrat Sanford Bishop, who has represented the district since 1993. Bishop was unchallenged in the primary.

Democratic primary

Candidates

Nominee
Sanford Bishop, incumbent U.S. Representative

Results

Republican primary

Candidates

Nominee
 Greg Duke, optician, former Lee County School Board member and nominee for this seat in 2014

Eliminated in primary
 Diane Vann, army nurse, candidate for Georgia's 8th congressional district in 2010 and Georgia's 12th congressional district in 2014

Withdrawn
 Bobby Scott

Results

General election

Results

District 3

The incumbent was Republican Lynn Westmoreland, who has represented the district since 2005.  Westmoreland announced he would not seek re-election.

Republican primary

Candidates

Nominee
 Drew Ferguson, former mayor of West Point

Eliminated in primary
 Sam Anders
 Mike Crane, state senator
 Chip Flanegan, business owner and candidate for this seat in 2012 & 2014
 Richard Mix
 Jim Pace
 Rod Thomas

Withdrawn
 Hayden Marlowe (running for the state senate)

Declined
 Lynn Westmoreland, incumbent U.S. Representative

Results

Runoff

Democratic primary

Candidates

Nominee
 Angela Pendley

Eliminated in primary
 Tamarkus Cook, pastor

Results

General election

Results

District 4

The incumbent was Democratic Hank Johnson, who has represented the district since 2007.  Johnson was unchallenged in the primary.

Democratic primary

Candidates

Nominee
Hank Johnson, incumbent U.S. Representative

Results

Republican primary

Candidates

Nominee
Victor Armendariz, business graduate

Results

General election

Results

District 5

The incumbent was Democratic John Lewis, who has represented the district since 1987. Lewis was unchallenged in the primary.

Democratic primary

Candidates

Nominee
John Lewis, incumbent U.S. Representative

Results

Republican primary

Candidates

Nominee
Douglas Bell, small business owner

Results

General election

Results

District 6

The incumbent was Republican Tom Price, who has represented the district since 2005.

Republican primary

Candidates

Nominee
Tom Price, incumbent U.S. Representative

Results

Democratic primary

Candidates

Nominee
Rodney Stooksbury

Results

General election

Results

District 7

The incumbent was Republican Rob Woodall, who has represented the district since 2011.

Republican primary

Candidates

Nominee
 Rob Woodall, incumbent U.S. Representative

Results

Democratic primary

Candidates

Nominee
Rashid Malik, entrepreneur and teacher

Results

General election

Results

District 8

The incumbent was Republican Austin Scott, who has represented the district since 2011.

Republican primary

Candidates

Nominee
Austin Scott, incumbent U.S. Representative

Eliminated in primary
Angela Hicks, truck driver

Results

Democratic primary

Candidates

Nominee
James Neal Harris, retired deputy sheriff with Bibb County Sheriff’s Office and candidate for this seat in 2006

Results

General election

Results

District 9

The incumbent was Republican Doug Collins, who has represented northeastern Georgia since 2013. He was re-elected with 81% of the vote in 2014.

Republican primary
Radio host and former Hall County Commissioner Al Gainey considered running against Collins in the Republican primary, following Collins' vote to re-elect John Boehner as Speaker of the House.

Candidates

Nominee
Doug Collins, incumbent U.S. Representative

Eliminated in primary
Paul Broun, former U.S. Representative and candidate for U.S. Senate in 2014
Roger Fitzpatrick, school principal and candidate for this seat in 2012
Bernie Fontaine, candidate for this seat in 2014
Mike Scupin

Declined
Al Gainey, radio host and former Hall County Commissioner

Results

General election

Results

District 10

The incumbent was Republican Jody Hice, who has represented the district since 2015.

Republican primary

Candidates

Nominee
Jody Hice, incumbent U.S. Representative

Results

General election

Results

District 11

The incumbent was Republican Barry Loudermilk, who has represented the district since 2015.

Republican primary

Candidates

Nominee
Barry Loudermilk, incumbent U.S. Representative

Eliminated in primary
Hayden Collins, radio talk show host
Daniel Cowan, businessman
Billy Davis
William Llop, certified public accountant and candidate for this seat in 2012

Results

Democratic primary

Candidates

Nominee
Don Wilson

Results

General election

Results

District 12

The incumbent was Republican Rick W. Allen, who has represented the district since 2015.

Republican primary

Candidates

Nominee
Rick W. Allen, incumbent U.S. Representative

Eliminated in primary
Eugene Yu, businessman and candidate for this seat in 2014

Results

Democratic primary

Candidates

Nominee
Tricia Carpenter McCracken, journalist

Eliminated in primary
Joyce Nolin

Results

General election

Results

District 13

The incumbent was Democrat David Scott, who has represented the district since 2003.

Democratic primary

Candidates

Nominee
David Scott, incumbent U.S. Representative

Results

General election

Results

District 14

The incumbent was Republican Tom Graves, who has represented northwestern Georgia since 2010.  He was re-elected in 2014 with no general election opposition.

Mickey Tuck, an electrician and 1992 Floyd County Commission candidate, is challenging Graves for the Republican nomination.

Republican primary

Candidates

Nominee
Tom Graves, incumbent U.S. Representative

Eliminated in primary
Allan Levene, businessman and candidate for Georgia's 11th congressional district in 2014
Mickey Tuck, electrician

Results

General election

Results

References

External links
U.S. House elections in Georgia, 2016 at Ballotpedia
Campaign contributions at OpenSecrets

Georgia
2016
2016 Georgia (U.S. state) elections